John "Jack" Ervin Nolan (May 30, 1899 – July 15, 1973) was a professional football player for the Los Angeles Buccaneers during their only season in the National Football League in 1926. He grew up in Los Angeles and graduated from Gardena High School before attending Santa Clara University.

Notes

All American Honorable Mention Right Guard Santa Clara University ( Pop Warner All American List 1924 )

1899 births
1973 deaths
Players of American football from Los Angeles
Los Angeles Buccaneers players
Santa Clara Broncos football players